The Ukrainian Academy of Printing is a Ukrainian academy in Lviv.

Post address: Lviv, Pidholosko st., 19, 79020, Ukraine

History
Specialist’s training for printing branch in Ukraine started in 1930 in the School of Printing Art founded by Stefan Kulzhenko.
Founded in 1917 in Kyiv, the Ukrainian Art Academy has become the first higher arts educational institution with a graphic workshop in the history of Ukraine.

In 1922 the Academy was reorganized in Kyiv Institute of Plastic Arts.  In the year 1923 Kyiv Art Institute was created (today it’s the National Academy of Visual Arts and Architecture) by the way of uniting Kyiv Institute of Plastic Arts and Kyiv Architecture Institute. The same year on the base of Kyiv Art Institute was created the printing faculty by the way of uniting of the graphic department of the Institute with the School of Printing Art. 50 students entered this faculty. They studied on the next three specializations: book and newspaper printing, color printing and printing of the stamps and illustrated magazines друк. Famous painter professor A. Kh. Sereda became the head of the faculty. At the same time printing faculties in the Art Institutes in Kharkiv, Odessa, Moscow and Leningrad were opened.

Campuses and buildings
Main Building in Lviv, Pidholosko street, 19
Faculty of Publishing, Printing and Information Technology (Pidholosko st., 19)
Faculty of Economics and Book Science (Pidholosko st, 19)
Faculty of Computer and Printing Engineering (Pidholosko st., 19)
Extra Mural Department (Pidvalna st., 17)
Center of After-Diploma Education (Pidvalna st., 17)
Preparatory department (Pidholosko st, 19)
Crimean Institute of Information and Printing Technologies (Simpheropol, Pushkina.st, 35)
Lviv Printing College (Lviv, Mytna square, 1)
Department of Work with the Foreign Companies and Institutions
Department of Work with Foreign Students 
Scientific and Technical Library
UAP Publishing House
Training and Production Experimental Printing House
Training and Demonstration Centre of "Heidelberg" Company

Institutes and faculties
FACULTY OF COMPUTER PRINTING ENGINEERING 
Directions and specialities:
Engineering Mechanics
Technology of Machine Building (Engineering Technology)
Packing Machines and Technology
Printing Machines and Automated Systems
Automation and Computer Integrated Technologies
Automated Control of Technology Process 
Computer-Integrated Technological Processes and Production
PUBLISHING AND PRINTING INFORMATION TECHNOLOGY FACULTY
Directions and specialities:
Publishing and Printing
Printed Editions Technology
Technology of Development, Production and Design of Packaging
Computer Technologies and Systems of Publishing and Printing Production
Technology of Electronic Multimedia Editions
Materials for Publishing and Printing production
Art
Fine and Applied Arts
ECONOMY AND BOOK BUSINESS FACULTY
Directions and specialities:
Journalism
Publishing and Editing
Advertising and Public Relations
Economics and Entrepreneurship
Economics of Enterprise
Accounting and Auditing
Marketing
Trade
Commodity and Commercial Activity

Notable Doctors and alumni
Aleksandr Aksinin — graphics artist
Yuri Andrukhovych — poet, novelist, translator and essayist
Sergei Balenok —  graphic artist, painter, illustrator
Viktor Merezhko — screenwriter, film director, playwright, actor, writer, TV presenter
Nicholas Zalevsky — Ukrainian-American artist
Danil "Dendi" Ishutin - A professional eSports player
Oleg Denysenko – world-renowned painter, graphic artist and sculptor.

References

Universities in Ukraine
1930 establishments in Ukraine
Universities and colleges in Lviv
Educational institutions established in 1930